The 2001 Family Circle Cup was a women's tennis tournament played on outdoor clay courts at the Family Circle Tennis Center in Charleston, South Carolina in the United States and was part of Tier I of the 2001 WTA Tour. It was the 29th edition of the tournament and ran from April 16 through April 22, 2001. Second-seeded Jennifer Capriati won the singles title.

Finals

Singles

 Jennifer Capriati defeated  Martina Hingis 6–0, 4–6, 6–4
 It was Capriati's 3rd title of the year and the 13th of her career.

Doubles

 Lisa Raymond /  Rennae Stubbs defeated  Virginia Ruano Pascual /  Paola Suárez 5–7, 7–6(7–5), 6–3
 It was Raymond's 3rd title of the year and the 23rd of her career. It was Stubbs' 3rd title of the year and the 27th of her career.

External links
 Official website
 WTA tournament profile

Family Circle Cup
Charleston Open
Family Circle Cup
Family Circle Cup
Family Circle Cup